Brigadier Hoshiar Singh Metro Station (formerly known as City Park metro station) is a terminus station on the Green Line of the Delhi Metro and is located  at  Bahadurgarh which comes under Jhajjar district of Haryana. It is an elevated station.

History

Station layout

Facilities

List of available ATM at Bahadurgarh City Park metro station are

Exits

Exit 1 (Gate No.1) – Tau Devilal Park, Sector-6, Sector-7, Housing Board Colony

Exit 2 (Gate No.2) – Old Industrial Area, Civil Hospital, New Basti, Nehru Park

See also
List of Delhi Metro stations
Transport in Delhi
Delhi Metro Rail Corporation
Delhi Suburban Railway
List of rapid transit systems in India

References

External links

 Delhi Metro Rail Corporation Ltd. (Official site) 
 Delhi Metro Annual Reports
 
 UrbanRail.Net – descriptions of all metro systems in the world, each with a schematic map showing all stations.

Delhi Metro stations
Railway stations in Jhajjar district